The 2004–2005 season was Kerkyra's 1st straight season on the Greek first tier, as newly promoted from the 2003-04 Beta Ethniki. Kerkyra ended last in the league and was relegated back.

Players

Squad

|}

Players who left during the season

|}

Managers
Nikos Anastopoulos: start of season – 10 January 2005
Manolis Papadopoulos (caretaker): 11 January 2005 – 25 January 2005
Georgios Firos: 25 January 2005 – 21 April 2005
Lakis Papaioannou: 21 April 2005 – 30 June 2005

Alpha Ethniki

League table

References
Weltfussball

A.O. Kerkyra seasons
Kerkyra